Kamulah Satu-Satunya (You're the Only One) is a 2007 Indonesian comedy film directed by Hanung Bramantyo and starring Nirina Zubir, Junior Liem, Didi Petet, Tarzan, Fanny Fadillah, Ringgo Agus Rahman, and Dennis Adhiswara. The film premiered on July 12, 2007 in Jakarta. Productions by Oreima Films & Starvision.

Cast
 Nirina Zubir as Indah 
 Junior Liem as Bowo 
 Didi Petet as Abah (Grandfather) 
 Dennis Adhiswara as Security 1
 Fanny Fadillah as Franky
 Ringgo Agus Rahman as Security 1
 Tarzan as Teacher
 Aline Adita as Presenter
 Andhara Early as presenter quiz
 Almir Jumandi as post man
 Epy Kusnandar as assistant 1
 ENce Bagus as assistant 2
 Yurike Prastika as Bowo's Aunt
 Pak Ogah as Indah's friend in Jakarta

Special Appearances
 Dewa 19

Plot

Indah, (Nirina Zubir) whose parents died a long time ago, is studying in high school and living a very poor lifestyle with her grandfather (Didi Petet). Indah never complains, but she holds on to her dream of meeting her favorite idol group Dewa Band face to face, whose songs are very inspirational to her.

Her dream is finally in reach when she hears that Dewa Band are giving out 10 tickets to fans to meet them directly through a lottery 
held throughout Indonesia. Bowo (Junior Liem), Indah's close friend, can't stand to see Indah disappointed because of his hidden feelings for her, strives to let Indah meet her idols by selling his beloved antiques bicycle and bringing her to Jakarta. Events don't go as planned, though, as Jakarta is not as Indah imagined.

Will Indah get to meet Dewa Band?

External links

Information
 @You're the Only One - Starvision

2007 films
2000s Indonesian-language films
2007 comedy films
Films shot in Indonesia
Films directed by Hanung Bramantyo
Indonesian comedy films